Henderson Chambers (May 1, 1908 – October 19, 1967) was an American jazz trombonist.

Early life and education 
Chambers was born in Alexandria, Louisiana. He studied at Leland College and Morehouse College, then joined Neil Montgomery's band in 1931.

Career 
Chambers played in Nashville with Doc Banks in 1932, then with Jack Jackson's Pullman Porters, Speed Webb, Zack Whyte, and Al Sears in Kentucky. During his career, he played tenor saxophone, trumpet, and tuba.

After two years with Tiny Bradshaw in the middle of the 1930s, Chambers moved to New York City, where he played with Chris Columbus at the Savoy Ballroom in 1939-40. Following this he played with Louis Armstrong, an erngagement which lasted until 1943. Later in the 1940s, he worked with Don Redman, Sy Oliver, Lucky Millinder, and Count Basie; in the 1950s he spent time with Cab Calloway, Doc Cheatham, Duke Ellington, and Mercer Ellington. He also did work as a studio musician. After joining Ray Charles's band from 1961 to 1963, Chambers played with Basie again until 1966.

Chambers finally played with Edgar Battle, shortly before his own death from a heart attack, in 1967 in New York City.

Discography

As sideman
With Count Basie
 Dance Session (Clef, 1953)
 Pop Goes the Basie (Reprise, 1965)
 Basie Picks the Winners (Verve, 1965)
 Basie Meets Bond (United Artists, 1966)
 Basie's Beatle Bag (Verve, 1966)
 Basie's Beat (Verve, 1967)
 Live at the Sands (Before Frank) (Reprise, 1998)

With Buck Clayton
 The Huckle-Buck and Robbins' Nest (Columbia, 1954)
 Buck Clayton Jams Benny Goodman (Columbia, 1955)
 All the Cats Join In (Columbia, 1956)
 Buck Meets Ruby (Vanguard, 1957)
 Just a Groove (Vanguard, 1973)

With others
 Gene Ammons, Sock! (Prestige, 1965)
 Cat Anderson, Cat On a Hot Tin Horn (Mercury, 1958)
 Sammy Davis Jr., I Gotta Right to Swing (Brunswick, 1960)
 Ella Fitzgerald, The First Lady of Song (Decca, 1958)
 Edmond Hall, Rompin' in '44 (Circle, 1983)
 Arthur Prysock & Count Basie, Arthur Prysock/Count Basie (Verve, 1966)
 Jimmy Rushing, Goin' to Chicago (Vanguard, 1955)
 Frank Sinatra & Count Basie, It Might as Well Be Swing (Reprise, 1964)
 Frank Sinatra, Sinatra at the Sands (Reprise, 1966)
 Ernie Wilkins, The Big New Band of the 60's (Everest, 1960)

References

External links
 Henderson Chambers recordings at the Discography of American Historical Recordings.

1908 births
1967 deaths
American jazz trombonists
Male trombonists
20th-century American musicians
20th-century trombonists
Jazz musicians from Louisiana
20th-century American male musicians
American male jazz musicians